Nathan Austin (born 15 February 1994) is an English professional footballer, who plays as a striker for Kelty Hearts. He has also previously played for East Fife, Falkirk and Inverness Caledonian Thistle.

Career
Austin, born in Hertfordshire, England moved to Scotland with his family in 2001 at the age of seven. Whilst playing for youth side East Wemyss District under-15s, Austin came to the attention of the media after being subjected to racist abuse during matches for the side. Initially it was reported that he was to quit football because of the abuse, however he vowed to persevere after receiving support from the public and then-Scottish FA chief executive Gordon Smith. Eventually Austin signed for amateur side Leven United, before moving on to Scottish League One side East Fife in July 2013.

Austin made his debut for the Methil club in the Scottish Challenge Cup against Forfar Athletic, coming on as an 85th minute substitute for Scott McBride and his first goal for the side came in a 1–0 defeat of Arbroath in January 2014. His second season with the club saw him improve on the five goals he scored in his debut season, with the striker netting 14 times in competitive 38 matches, including a hat-trick against Threave Rovers in the Scottish Cup and four in the league against Elgin City in a 3–5 victory. His third season with East Fife started even more brightly, and by January 2016 Austin had scored 16 goals in 25 appearances, adding two further hat-tricks to his score-sheet against both Montrose and Stirling Albion. His performances attracted the attention of a number of top-tier sides, with Motherwell, Aberdeen and Dundee all reported as targeting Austin for a potential move. Austin was eventually signed by Scottish Championship side Falkirk on 15 January 2016, with the player remaining at Bayview Stadium on loan for the remainder of the season as part of the deal.

Austin continued to lead the line prolifically for the Fifers in the second half of the season; he scored one goal and assisted another the day after his transfer to Falkirk in a 4–2 win away to Annan Athletic, and also scored the following week in a 3–1 away victory at East Stirling. East Fife were to go on a great run of form towards the business end of the season, and eventually finished top of League Two, ensuring promotion to League One and giving Austin a league winners medal.

Austin spent just under two years with Falkirk, before being released from his contract in December 2017. He then signed for Inverness Caledonian Thistle, and made his debut in a 1–1 draw against Livingston on 2 January 2018. He scored his first hat-trick for the club on 14 April 2018, in 5–1 win against Dumbarton.

In May 2019, Austin signed for Lowland League side Kelty Hearts. He was loaned to East Fife in March 2021.

Personal life
Austin's younger brother Jordan is also a footballer and played alongside him at East Fife.

Career statistics

Honours

Club
East Fife
Scottish League Two: 2015–16
Kelty Hearts
Lowland League: 2019–20, 2020–21
Scottish League Two: 2021–22

Individual
PFA Scotland Team of the Year League Two: 2015–16
PFA Scotland Team of the Year League Two: 2021–22
Lowland League Top Goalscorer: 2019–20

References

External links

1994 births
Association football forwards
East Fife F.C. players
Falkirk F.C. players
Living people
Scottish footballers
Scottish Professional Football League players
Inverness Caledonian Thistle F.C. players
Footballers from Fife
Black British sportspeople
Scottish people of Barbadian descent
Kelty Hearts F.C. players
Lowland Football League players
Anglo-Scots